Robin Ammerlaan (born 26 February 1968 in The Hague) is a Dutch former professional wheelchair tennis player. A former world No. 1 in both singles and doubles, Ammerlaan is a 14-time major champion and two-time Paralympic gold medalist. The right-handed player's favourite surface is carpet, and he was coached by Gert Bolk. His wheelchair is manufactured by Invacare. Ammerlaan ended his professional career after the 2012 London Paralympics.

Paralympic games

Sydney 2000
He won the gold medal for Wheelchair tennis men double with Ricky Molier. In the final they played against David Johnson and David Hall from Australia.

Athens 2004
He won the gold medal for Wheelchair tennis men singles. In the final he played against David Hall
from Australia.

Beijing 2008
He won the silver medal for wheelchair tennis men single. He lost in the final from Shingo Kunieda from Japan

Grand Slam Titles

Singles 
 2006 French Open
 2005 US Open
 2005 Australian Open
 2003 Australian Open
 2002 Australian Open

Doubles 
 2008 Wimbledon (w/ Vink)
 2007 Wimbledon (w/ Vink)
 2007 Australian Open (w/ Kunieda)
 2006 US Open (w/ Jeremiasz)
 2006 Australian Open (w/ Legner)
 2005 US Open (w/ Jeremiasz)
 2005 Australian Open (w/ Legner)
 2004 Australian Open (w/ Legner)
 2003 Australian Open (w/ Kruszelnicki)

Performance timelines

Singles

Doubles

References

External links

 
 

1968 births
Living people
Dutch male tennis players
Dutch people with disabilities
Wheelchair tennis players
Sportspeople from The Hague
Paralympic wheelchair tennis players of the Netherlands
Paralympic gold medalists for the Netherlands
Paralympic silver medalists for the Netherlands
Paralympic medalists in wheelchair tennis
Medalists at the 2000 Summer Paralympics
Medalists at the 2004 Summer Paralympics
Medalists at the 2008 Summer Paralympics
Wheelchair tennis players at the 2000 Summer Paralympics
Wheelchair tennis players at the 2004 Summer Paralympics
Wheelchair tennis players at the 2008 Summer Paralympics
ITF number 1 ranked wheelchair tennis players
ITF World Champions